The Improved Family, later replaced by the Model 15, is a sewing machine produced by the Singer Manufacturing Company during the 19th century. In 1895, it was replaced by the very similar Model 15.  It utilizes an oscillating shuttle, but is otherwise quite similar to the Model 27-series machines.

References

Sewing machines